Armenia competed at the 2000 Summer Olympics in Sydney, Australia.

Medalists

Athletics

Men
Field events

Women
Track

Boxing

Canoeing

Flatwater

Diving

Men

Judo

Shooting

Swimming

Men

Women

Tennis

Weightlifting

Men

Wrestling

Greco–Roman

Freestyle

References
 Wallechinsky, David (2004). The Complete Book of the Summer Olympics (Athens 2004 Edition). Toronto, Canada. .
 International Olympic Committee (2001). The Results. Retrieved 12 November 2005.
 Sydney Organising Committee for the Olympic Games (2001). Official Report of the XXVII Olympiad Volume 1: Preparing for the Games. Retrieved 20 November 2005.
 Sydney Organising Committee for the Olympic Games (2001). Official Report of the XXVII Olympiad Volume 2: Celebrating the Games. Retrieved 20 November 2005.
 Sydney Organising Committee for the Olympic Games (2001). The Results. Retrieved 20 November 2005.
 International Olympic Committee Web Site
 sports-reference

2000 in Armenian sport
Nations at the 2000 Summer Olympics
2000